Aakhir Bahu Bhi Toh Beti Hee Hai (English: A daughter-in-law is after all a daughter) is an Indian television drama series which premiered on 30 September 2013 on Sahara One. Produced by Pradeep Mishra, the series stars Payal Rajput and Prachee Pathak.

Overview
The story focuses on the evolving relationship between a daughter-in-law, Siya (played by Payal Rajput) and mother-in-law, Naulakha Devi (played by Prachee Pathak).

Cast
Payal Rajput as Siya 
Aryan Pandit as Samar 
Prachee Pathak as Naulakha Devi
Sangam Rai as Prabhat

References

Indian drama television series
Sahara One original programming
2013 Indian television series debuts
2014 Indian television series endings